Gordon Henderson (born 27 January 1948) is a British politician who has served as the Member of Parliament (MP) for the Sittingbourne and Sheppey constituency in Kent since the 2010 general election. He is a member of the Conservative Party.

Professional career
Henderson left school at 15 and started work as a stockroom assistant in a Woolworths shop in Chatham. He advanced through the ranks of the company, becoming a senior store manager. Henderson left Woolworths in 1979 after 15 years with the company.

After leaving Woolworths Henderson went through a range of jobs and ran his own restaurant in South Africa. He was also a senior contracts officer for GEC Marconi, and worked for a Rochester based wine company. Before entering parliament Henderson worked as an operations manager for an alcohol-based gifts company, the largest in the UK.

Political career
Henderson has a long-standing interest in politics. He is a fully qualified Conservative Party political agent and was the constituency agent for North Thanet MP, Roger Gale.

Henderson has served as deputy leader of Swale Borough Council twice and was also a member of Kent County Council, during which time he sat both on the education committee and the Kent Police Authority. In 2001, Henderson contested the seat of Luton South; he was unsuccessful, losing by 10,000 votes. In 2005, Henderson contested the Sittingbourne and Sheppey seat and came second, losing by only 79 votes. In 2010, Henderson once again stood for Sittingbourne and Sheppey, this time he received a 12,383 majority (50.5% of the vote)

He was a supporter of the Better Off Out campaign which called for the United Kingdom to leave the European Union. In 2010, he stated that the non-Conservative politician he most admired was Nigel Farage. In 2014, Henderson responded to speculation about a possible defection to UKIP by issuing a statement saying defection was something he had considered, but he viewed their other policies as "muddled and contradictory".

During the 2019 General Election Henderson increased his vote share at the election by over 7%.

In March 2023, Henderson announced he would retire at the next general election.

Personal life
Henderson was born in the Medway towns. He is married with three children, and seven grandchildren. Henderson has lived on the Isle of Sheppey for over 30 years. He is a long time supporter of Gillingham F.C. and Partick Thistle F.C. Henderson has been involved in local voluntary work, as an instructor in the Army Cadet Force, as a director of the SWIM training centre (Sittingbourne) and as a school governor at Eastchurch Primary School (Sheppey) and the Cheyne Middle School (Sheppey).  He is currently chairman of Litter Angels, which holds annual workshops in primary schools across Sittingbourne and Sheppey and runs an anti-litter poster competition.

References

External links 
 Official website

1948 births
Living people
UK MPs 2010–2015
UK MPs 2015–2017
UK MPs 2017–2019
UK MPs 2019–present
Conservative Party (UK) councillors
Councillors in Kent
Members of Kent County Council
Conservative Party (UK) MPs for English constituencies
School governors